David Richard Riske (born October 23, 1976) is a former Major League Baseball relief pitcher.

Career
Riske was drafted by the Cleveland Indians in the 56th round of the June  amateur draft. In January , he was traded along with outfielder Coco Crisp, and catcher Josh Bard to the Boston Red Sox in exchange for reliever Guillermo Mota, third baseman Andy Marte, and catcher Kelly Shoppach.

Riske was traded on June 15 of that year to the Chicago White Sox for minor league pitcher Javier López. Theo Epstein commented that Riske was traded because the Red Sox had too many right-handed relievers, and needed a left-hander like Lopez. He throws a low-90s fastball, but due to his deceptive delivery, it appears even faster. He also throws a slider and a split-fingered fastball.

Having posted solid numbers the past two seasons, Riske continued to put up good numbers in the 2005 season. In 58 games and 72 innings, Riske had an ERA of 3.10 and a WHIP of 0.96. His strikeout total had noticeably declined over the past two seasons. In 2005 Riske experienced his first season in which he did not average more than one strikeout per inning pitched. Riske played a minor role with the Red Sox in 2006, mainly appearing in blow-out games before being traded.

Leader in the bullpen
Besides being a leader on the field, he was also a leader off. He was credited with helping turn around Zack Greinke's career.

On October 31, 2007, Riske declined his $2.9 million player option. Later, on December 5, he signed a three-year contract with the Milwaukee Brewers. Riske was released by the Brewers on August 23, 2010.

On February 7, 2011, Riske signed a minor league deal with the Baltimore Orioles. He was released after spring training, and retired.

References

External links

1976 births
Boston Red Sox players
Chicago White Sox players
Cleveland Indians players
Kansas City Royals players
Kinston Indians players
Akron Aeros players
Buffalo Bisons (minor league) players
Pawtucket Red Sox players
Living people
Major League Baseball pitchers
Green River Gators baseball players
Baseball players from Washington (state)
Milwaukee Brewers players
Nashville Sounds players
Brevard County Manatees players
Sportspeople from Renton, Washington